New Tai Lue is a Unicode block containing characters for writing the Tai Lü language.

History
The following Unicode-related documents record the purpose and process of defining specific characters in the New Tai Lue block:

References 

Unicode blocks